Kiani Heipuarii Mareva Wong (born 21 November 2000) is a Tahitian professional footballer who plays as a midfielder for 2. Frauen-Bundesliga club 1. FC Saarbrücken and the Tahiti women's national team.

Early life and training 
Wong has played football since the age of 4. Her father is a football coach. In Tahiti, she played for A.S. Tefana for ten years, and was a finalist for the Tahiti Nui cup as an U15 player. 

In May 2016 she attended the INF Clairefontaine in France. While overseas she studied at the Lycée Jean Monnet and University of Strasbourg.

Club career 
Wong was subsequently recruited by FC Vendenheim in Alsace, France. She later played with Cardiff City in Wales, and signed with Yeovil Town Women in England at the end of 2019. In the fall of 2020, Wong transferred to 1. FC Saarbrücken in Germany, and was expected to start playing immediately due to team injuries.

International career 
Kiani Wong was selected for the Tahiti national team for the 2018 OFC Women's Nations Cup and for the 2019 Pacific Games in Apia, Samoa. In 2021, she was appointed as a football ambassador by the Oceania Football Confederation as part of its women's football strategy.

In February 2022, she was selected for Tahiti's friendly matches against Luxembourg and Andorra. In July,  she was named to the squad for the 2022 OFC Women's Nations Cup.

References

2000 births
Living people
People from Papeete
French Polynesian women's footballers
Women's association football midfielders
Cardiff City Ladies F.C. players
Yeovil Town L.F.C. players
1. FC Saarbrücken (women) players
2. Frauen-Bundesliga players
Tahiti women's international footballers
French Polynesian people of Chinese descent
French Polynesian expatriate footballers
French expatriate sportspeople in Wales
Expatriate women's footballers in Wales
French expatriate sportspeople in England
Expatriate women's footballers in England
French expatriate sportspeople in Germany
Expatriate women's footballers in Germany